Thomas H. Horton (October 11, 1859 – October 17, 1943) was an American farmer and politician.

Horton was born in Cleveland, Ohio. He moved to Anoka County, Minnesota in 1873 and then moved to Isanti County, Minnesota. He lived with his wife and family in North Branch, Minnesota and was a farmer. He served on the Isanti County Commission for six years and was the chair. Horton served in the Minnesota House of Representatives from 1907 to 1910 and in 1923 and 1924. He was a Republican.

References

1859 births
1943 deaths
Politicians from Cleveland
People from Lanesboro, Minnesota
People from North Branch, Minnesota
Farmers from Minnesota
County commissioners in Minnesota
Republican Party members of the Minnesota House of Representatives